Balacra elegans is a moth of the family Erebidae. It was described by Per Olof Christopher Aurivillius in 1892 and is found in Cameroon, the Democratic Republic of the Congo, Equatorial Guinea, Liberia, Uganda and Zambia.

References

Balacra
Moths described in 1892
Erebid moths of Africa